Chagnon  is a surname. Notable people with the surname include:

Paschal Chagnon (1765–1825), Canadian merchant and political figure
Leon Chagnon (1902–1953), American professional baseball pitcher
André Chagnon (1928–2022), Canadian businessman and philanthropist
Napoleon Chagnon (1938–2019), American anthropologist
Claude Chagnon (born 1948), Canadian ice hockey player
Jacques Chagnon (born 1952), Canadian politician
Christian Chagnon (born 1956), Canadian handball player
Marcel (singer) (born Marcel Chagnon, 1975), American country singer
Frédéric Chagnon (born 1992), Canadian football player
Diane Chagnon, former mayor of Azusa, California
Cheryle Chagnon-Greyeyes, Alberta politician

French-language surnames